Simon Kristian Bloch Jørgensen (born 1 September 1992) is a Danish professional footballer who plays as a goalkeeper for Waltham Abbey.

Career
Born in Flensburg, Germany, Bloch spent his early career with Frem, FC Copenhagen, B.93 and B.1908. He left Frem in November 2016 by mutual consent, after making 53 appearances for them. He played one game Waltham Forest in the Essex Senior League during the 2016–17 season. He signed for Brønshøj in March 2017, before moving to English club Accrington Stanley in August 2017. He made one appearance for the club, in the EFL Cup on 8 August 2017 before joining National League South side Whitehawk, where he made four league appearances. After a year at Danish 2nd Division club Greve IF, on 7 February 2019, he signed for National League South side Dulwich Hamlet.

In August 2020 he signed for Waltham Abbey.

Personal life
His grandfather Bloch Kristian Petersen and his great-uncle Kaj Hansen were both footballers. With a 2.10 m height, he is considered as the tallest footballer in history.

References

1992 births
Living people
Danish men's footballers
Boldklubben Frem players
F.C. Copenhagen players
Boldklubben af 1893 players
Boldklubben 1908 players
Walthamstow F.C. players
Brønshøj Boldklub players
Accrington Stanley F.C. players
Whitehawk F.C. players
Dulwich Hamlet F.C. players
Association football goalkeepers
Danish expatriate men's footballers
Danish expatriate sportspeople in England
Expatriate footballers in England
Greve Fodbold players
Waltham Abbey F.C. players